L'Atelier de Joël Robuchon is a Michelin 2-star French restaurant located in Minato, Tokyo, Japan. The restaurant is part of the L'Atelier de Joël Robuchon family of restaurants.

See also
 List of French restaurants

References

External links

Tourist attractions in Tokyo
Restaurants in Tokyo
Michelin Guide starred restaurants in Japan
French restaurants in Japan